Mary Eliza Fullerton (14 May 1868 – 23 February 1946) was an Australian writer.

Biography
Fullerton was born on 14 May 1868 in Glenmaggie, Victoria. She was educated at home by her mother and at the local state school. After leaving school she stayed on her parents' property, until she moved to Melbourne in her early twenties.

She was active in the women's suffrage movement from the 1890s and early 1900s. During World War I she wrote articles on feminist issues and arguing against conscription for Victorian publications. She was a member the Victorian Socialist Party and the Women's Political Association.

She visited England in 1912 and moved there in 1922 with her companion Mabel Singleton.

Fullerton died in Maresfield, England on 23 February 1946.

Literary career
She wrote stories, articles and verse for magazines and periodicals, sometimes under the pseudonym Alpenstock. She wrote three novels between 1921 and 1925 under her own name, but fearing prejudice against her as a woman without a university education, publication of her two last works in verse, Moles do so little with their privacy and The wonder and the apple, were published under the pseudonym E.  Their publication was arranged by her friend Miles Franklin. Her identity as their author was revealed after her death.

Bibliography

See also
 List of Australian women writers
 List of women writers

References

Further reading
Martin, S. 2001, Passionate Friends: Mary Fullerton, Mabel Singleton and Miles Franklin, London, Onlywomen Press. 
Martin, S. 1998, 'Becoming-Violet: Mary Fullerton's Poetry and Lesbian Desire', Proceedings of the 19th Annual Conference of the Association for the Study of Australian Literature 1997, ASAL 1998, pp. 99–104.
Martin, S. 1997, 'Desire in the Love Poetry of Mary Fullerton', Hecate, Vol. 23, No. 2, pp. 95–103.
Martin, S. 1996, The polygamy of friendship : Mary Fullerton, Mabel Singleton, and Miles Franklin, Thesis (PhD), Griffith University. 
Martin, S. 1994, 'Past All I Know is All I Feel: Mary Fullerton's Poetry and Lesbian Desire', in Kay Ferres, ed. Coastscripts: Gender Representations in the Arts, AIWRAP: Griffith University, pp. 15–26.
Martin, S. 1993, 'Rethinking Passionate Friendships: the Writing of Mary Fullerton', Women's History Review, Vol. 2, No. 2, pp. 395–406.
Precious correspondence from Australian feminist, writer and poet Mary Fullerton by Jessye Wdowin-McGregor

1868 births
1946 deaths
20th-century Australian novelists
20th-century Australian women writers
Australian feminist writers
Australian women novelists
Australian women poets
Australian suffragists
19th-century Australian women
People from Maresfield